= Thomas Murphine =

American politician

Thomas F. Murphine
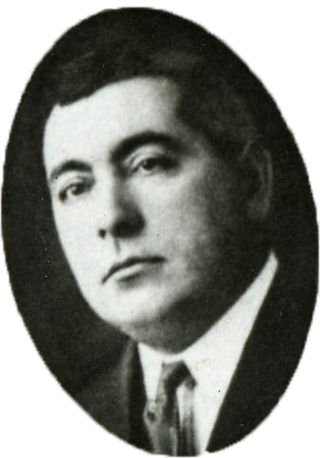
- Murphine in 1913

Member of the Washington House of Representatives for the 42nd district
- In office 1913–1917; 1921–1925

Personal details
- Born: July 9, 1878 Ohio, United States
- Died: November 18, 1943 (aged 65) Los Angeles County, California, United States
- Party: Progressive; Republican

Thomas Floyd Murphine (July 9, 1878 – November 18, 1943) was an American politician in the state of Washington. He served in the Washington House of Representatives.
